Anthony "Tony" Smith (born 22 January 1952) is a former Australian rules footballer who played with Carlton in the Victorian Football League (VFL). He later played for Brunswick in the Victorian Football Association.

Notes

External links 

Tony Smith's profile at Blueseum

1952 births
Carlton Football Club players
Living people
Australian rules footballers from Victoria (Australia)
Brunswick Football Club players